John Tollemache may refer to:
 John Tollemache, 1st Baron Tollemache (1805–1890), British member of parliament and landowner
 John Tollemache, 5th Baron Tollemache (born 1939), English peer and landowner
 John Manners Tollemache (c. 1768–1837), British gentleman and member of parliament